Patrick Galbraith and Justin Gimelstob were the defending champions, but did not partner together this year.  Galbraith partnered Brian MacPhie, losing in the quarterfinals.  Gimelstob partnered Jared Palmer, losing in the first round.

Donald Johnson and Piet Norval won the title, defeating Ellis Ferreira and Rick Leach 1–6, 6–4, 6–3 in the final.

Seeds

  Ellis Ferreira /  Rick Leach (final)
  Jonas Björkman /  Byron Black (first round)
  Justin Gimelstob /  Jared Palmer (first round)
  David Adams /  John-Laffnie de Jager (semifinals)

Draw

Draw

External links
 Draw

Nottingham Open
2000 ATP Tour
2000 Nottingham Open